Jeff Hafley (born April 4, 1979) is an American football coach. He is the head football coach at Boston College, a position he has held since 2020.

Early life and paying career
Raised in Montvale, New Jersey, Hafley played prep football at Pascack Hills High School.

Hafley was a four-year letterman, from 1997 to 2000. as a wide receiver on the Siena Saints football team and graduated in 2001 from Siena College with a bachelor's degree in history. He earned a master's degree from the University at Albany, SUNY in 2003.

Coaching career
Before entering the NFL ranks, Hafley spent 11 years on the collegiate sidelines with coaching stints at Worcester Polytechnic (2001), Albany (2002–05), Pittsburgh (2006–10) and Rutgers (2011). While at Rutgers, the Scarlet Knights were the ninth-ranked passing defense in the country and Duron Harmon earned first-team All-Big East honors and Logan Ryan received second-team accolades. Both Harmon and Ryan were drafted by and played for the New England Patriots.

In 2012, Hafley made his NFL coaching debut with the Tampa Bay Buccaneers. He joined the Bucs as assistant defensive backs coach and spent 2013 as the secondary coach/safeties. In 2013, Hafley oversaw a unit which helped Tampa Bay finish tied for third in the NFL with 21 interceptions. On January 27, 2014, Hafley was hired by the Cleveland Browns to coach the secondary. Hafley would remain in this role for 2 seasons (2014–15), before being relieved of his duties due to a coaching overhaul. On January 24, 2016, Hafley was hired by San Francisco 49ers' new head coach Chip Kelly to coach the defensive backs. In 2019, he was hired to be the co-defensive coordinator at Ohio State. Hafley quickly established himself as one of the best recruiters in the country, being ranked ninth overall recruiter for the 2020 class by 247Sports.com. On December 13, 2019, he was hired to be the head coach at Boston College after the firing of Steve Addazio.

Head coaching record

Personal life 
Hafley is the father of two daughters, Hope (born 2016) and Leah (born 2019).

References

External links
 Boston College profile

1979 births
Living people
Albany Great Danes football coaches
Boston College Eagles football coaches
Cleveland Browns coaches
Ohio State Buckeyes football coaches
Pittsburgh Panthers football coaches
Rutgers Scarlet Knights football coaches
San Francisco 49ers coaches
Siena Saints football players
Tampa Bay Buccaneers coaches
WPI Engineers football coaches
University at Albany, SUNY alumni
Pascack Hills High School alumni
People from Montvale, New Jersey
Sportspeople from Bergen County, New Jersey